Javan Qaleh (also Romanized as Javān Qal‘eh and Javānqal‘eh; also known as Gown Maḥalleh) is a city in Qaleh Chay District of Ajab Shir County, East Azerbaijan province, Iran. At the 2006 census, its population was 622 in 133 households, when it was a village. The following census in 2011 counted 589 people in 167 households. The latest census in 2016 showed a population of 700 people in 213 households, by which time the village had been raised to the status of a city.

References 

Ajab Shir County

Cities in East Azerbaijan Province

Populated places in East Azerbaijan Province

Populated places in Ajab Shir County